Pelyša is a river of Anykščiai district municipality, Utena County, northeastern Lithuania. It flows for 19.3 kilometres and has a basin area of 109.2 km2.

It is a right tributary of the Šventoji.

References
 LIETUVOS RESPUBLIKOS UPIŲ IR TVENKINIŲ KLASIFIKATORIUS (Republic of Lithuania- River and Pond Classifications).  Ministry of Environment (Lithuania). Accessed 2011-11-14.

Rivers of Lithuania
Anykščiai District Municipality